Kvål Station is a railway station in the village of Kvål in the municipality of Melhus in Trøndelag county, Norway. It is served by local trains to Røros Station. The station was opened 1864 as part of the Trondhjem–Støren Line.

References

Railway stations in Melhus
Railway stations on the Dovre Line
Railway stations opened in 1864
1864 establishments in Norway